Crystal Johnson may refer to:

 Crystal Johnson (attorney) (born 1977), States Attorney for Minnehaha County, South Dakota
 Crystal Johnson (singer), singer, songwriter, producer, and actress from Brooklyn, New York